These are lists of the most common Chinese surnames in China (People's Republic of China), Taiwan (Republic of China), and the Chinese diaspora overseas as provided by authoritative government or academic sources. Chinese names also form the basis for many common Cambodian, Vietnamese, Korean, and Japanese surnames and to an extent, Filipino surnames in both translation and transliteration into those languages.

The conception of China as consisting of the "old 100 families" is an ancient and traditional one, the most notable tally being the Song-era Hundred Family Surnames. Even today, the number of surnames in China is a little over 4,000, while the year 2000 US census found there are more than 6.2 million surnames altogether and that the number of surnames held by 100 or more Americans (per name) was just over 150,000.

The Chinese expression "Three Zhang Four Li" is used to mean "anyone" or "everyone", but the most common surnames are currently Wang in mainland China and Chen in Taiwan. A commonly cited factoid from the 1990 edition of the Guinness Book of World Records estimated that Zhang was the most common surname in the world, but no comprehensive information from China was available at the time and more recent editions have not repeated the claim. However, Zhang Wei (张伟) is the most common full name in mainland China.

The top five surnames in China – Wang, Li, Zhang, Liu, Chen – are also the top five surnames in the world, each with over 70-100 million worldwide.

Greater China

China
This list of the 100 most common Chinese surnames derives from China's Ministry of Public Security's annual report on the top 100 surnames in China, with the latest report release in January 2020 for the year 2019. When the 1982 Chinese census was first published, it did not include a list of top surnames. However, in 2004, the State Post Bureau subsequently used the census data to release a series of commemorative stamps in honor of the then-most-common surnames in 2004.

The summary of the 2007 survey revealed China had approximately 92,881,000 Wangs (7.25% of the population), 92,074,000 Lis (7.19%), and 87,502,000 Zhangs (6.83%).

A 2018 survey showed that Liu and Chen were the next most common China with more than 70 million each.

These top five surnames— Wang, Li, Zhang, Liu, Chen—alone accounted for more people than Indonesia, the fourth most populous country in the world, and their total number is around the population of the USA, the third most populous country in the world.

The next five--Yang, Huang, Zhao, Wu, and Zhou—were each shared by more than 20 million Chinese. Twelve moreXu, Sun, Ma, Zhu, Hu, Guo, He, Gao, Lin, Luo, Zheng, and Liangwere each shared by more than 10 million.

All together, the top hundred surnames accounted for 84.77% of China's population. By way of comparison, the 2000 census found the most common surname in the United StatesSmithhad fewer than 2.4 million occurrences and made up only 0.84% of the general population. The top 100 surnames accounted for only 16.4% of the US population, and reaching 89.8% of the US population required more than 150,000 surnames.

Surname list 

Notes

Other surveys

 2006 multi-year survey and study conducted by Yuan Yida, a researcher at the Chinese Academy of Sciences's Institute of Genetics and Developmental Biology, using a sample size of 296 million spread across 1,110 counties and cities and recording around 4,100 surnames.
 1990: Ji Yuwen Publishing House, based on a sample size of 174,900.
 1987 study conducted by Yuan Yida with a sample size of 570,000.
 1977 study published by Li Dongming, a Chinese historian, as "Surname" (《姓》) in Dongfang Magazine.

400 character list
In 2013 the Fuxi Institution compiled a ranking of the 400 most common surnames in China.

Taiwan

According to a comprehensive survey of residential permits released by the Taiwanese Ministry of the Interior's Department of Population in 2016, Taiwan has only 1,503 surnames. The top ten surnames in Taiwan accounted for 52.77% of the general population, and the top 100 accounted for 96.56%.

Other surveys

 1994–2011: The American researcher Chih-Hao Tsai has compiled unauthoritative annual surveys of the most common surnames on Taiwan based on published lists of all successful applicants taking Taiwan's Joint College Entrance Exam. The test was mandatory for college entrance until 2002 and is still quite common, with more than a hundred thousand successful applicants a year and a pass rate for all test takers between 60 and 90%.

Philippines 
Chinese Filipinos whose ancestors came to the Philippines from 1898 onward usually have single syllable Chinese surnames. On the other hand, most Chinese ancestors came to the Philippines prior to 1898 usually have multiple-syllable Chinese surnames such as Gokongwei, Ongpin, Pempengco, Yuchengco, Teehankee, and Yaptinchay among such others. These were originally full Chinese names which were transliterated in Spanish orthography and adopted as surnames.

Common Chinese Filipino surnames are: Tan/Chan (陳/陈), Dy/Dee/Lee/Li (李), Sy/See/Siy/Sze (施), Lim/Lam (林), Chua/Choa/Choi (蔡), Yap/Ip (葉/叶), Co/Ko/Kho (許/许), Ko/Gao/Caw (高), Ho/Haw/Hau/Caw (侯), Cua/Kua/Co/Kho/Ko (柯), Coo/Khoo/Cu/Kuh (邱), Go/Ngo/Wu (吳/吴), Ong/Wong (王), Ang/Hong/Hung (洪), Lao (劉/刘), Tiu/Cheung (張/张), Yu/Young (楊/杨), Auyong/Awyoung (歐陽/欧阳), Ng/Uy/Wee/Hong/Wong/Huang (黃), Tiu/Chiu/Chio/Chu (趙/赵), Chu/Chiu/Chow (周), King (龔), Chan (曾), Ty/Tee (鄭/郑), Ching/Cheng/Chong (莊/庄), Que/Cue/Kwok (郭), Leong/Liong/Leung (梁), etc.

There are also multiple-syllable Chinese surnames that are Spanish transliterations of Hokkien words. Surnames like Tuazon (Eldest Grandson, 大孫), Dizon (Second Grandson, 二孫), Samson/Sanson (Third Grandson, 三孫), Sison (Fourth Grandson, 四孫), Gozon/Goson/Gozum (Fifth Grandson, 五孫), Lacson (Sixth Grandson, 六孫) are examples of transliterations of designations that use the Hokkien suffix -son (孫) used as surnames for some Chinese Filipinos who trace their ancestry from Chinese immigrants to the Philippines during the Spanish Colonial Period. The surname "Son/Sun" (孫) is listed in the classic Chinese text Hundred Family Surnames, perhaps shedding light on the Hokkien suffix -son used here as a surname alongside some sort of accompanying enumeration scheme.

Canada
Statistics Canada has not released a list of common surnames for any of its recent censuses, but much of the Canadian Chinese population is clustered in Metro Vancouver and Greater Victoria in British Columbia and the Greater Toronto and Hamilton Area and the Ottawa-Gatineau Area in Ontario, as well as in some emerging major clusters, such as the Calgary–Edmonton Corridor in Alberta, Montreal, and the Communauté métropolitaine de Québec (Quebec Community Metropolitan Area) in Quebec.

Ontario
A 2010 study by Baiju Shah & al data-mined the Registered Persons Database of Canadian health card recipients in the province of Ontario for a particularly Chinese-Canadian name list. Ignoring potentially non-Chinese spellings such as Lee (49,898 total), they found that the most common Chinese names in Ontario were:

Indonesia

Nearly as large is the Chinese Indonesian community. The 2010 Indonesian census reported more than 2.8 million self-identified Chinese, or about 1% of the general population. Just as in Thailand, though, previous legislation (in this case, 127/U/Kep/12/1966) had banned ethnic Chinese surnames throughout the country. This law was abolished after the removal of Suharto, but Chinese Indonesian names remain a mix of Indonesian, pinyin, peh-oe-ji, and Dutch-spelled Hokkien.

Malaysia

During the 2010 Malaysian Census, approximately 6,960,000 Malaysians of Chinese ethnicity. Chinese is the second largest ethnicity in Malaysia, after the Malays.

Singapore

Ethnic Chinese make up almost three-fourths (2009) of Singapore's resident population of nearly four million (2011).

2000 
According to Statistics Singapore, as of the year 2000, the most common Chinese Singaporean names were:

 As most Singaporeans of Chinese descent have ancestors which originated from Southern China, mainly from Fujian, Guangdong and Hainan, the distribution of surnames in Singapore is quite different from that of Mainland China.
 As there are a variety of dialect groups in Singapore, the same surname in Chinese characters may be romanised in several different ways in Singapore. Some less common Chinese transcriptions of the 20 most common romanised surnames may not be listed in the table above.

Newer version 
There is a newer list of most common surnames in Singapore from an unknown year. Some numbers are missing as the original list contains several non-Chinese surnames, which have been excluded from the table below.

Thailand

The largest Chinese diaspora community in the world are the Chinese Thais (or Sino-Thais), who make up 12–14% of the total Thai population. However, very few of the Chinese Thais have Chinese surnames, after the 1913 Surname Act that required the adoption of Thai surnames in order to enjoy Thai citizenship. Moreover, the same law requires that those possessing the same surname be related, meaning that immigrant Chinese may not adopt the surname of their clansmen unless they can show actual kinship.

United States
The 2010 US Census found 3,794,673 self-identified Chinese Americans and 230,382 self-identified Taiwanese Americans, up from 2,734,841 Chinese Americans and 144,795 Taiwanese Americans in 2000.

Although the Chinese make up the largest segment of the U.S. Asian and Pacific Islander population, the most common Chinese-derived surname during the 2000 census was not itself Chinese but the Vietnamese Nguyễn (Chinese: , Ruǎn).

During the 2000 census, the 10 most common Chinese American names were:

 Other surveys
 2002: study by Matthew Falkenstein, data-mining the 2000 US Census for a particularly Asian & Pacific Islander name list, omitting those like Lee that are common among other ethnicities
 2000: study by Diane Lauderdale, et al., data-mining Social Security card applications by persons born abroad before 1941 for a particularly Chinese-American name list

See also

Notes

References

External links 
 Lin Yutang's Chinese-English Dictionary of Modern Usage, hosted at the Chinese University of Hong Kong. (~700 surnames)
 Netor's Ten-Thousand Families 
 人口排序 [China's Surname Population Rankings], lists of the most popular surnames under the Song, Yuan, and Ming dynasties 
 Top 10 Surnames in Each Chinese Province and City

Common
Surnames
Chinese
Chinese surnames